RIGIBOR stands for the Riga Interbank Offered Rate and is a daily reference rate based on the interest rates at which banks offer to lend unsecured funds to other banks in the Latvia wholesale money market (or interbank market). RIGIBOR is published daily by the National Bank of Latvia together with RIGIBID (Riga Interbank Bid Rate).

See also 
Euribor
TALIBOR

References

External links
RIGIBOR and RIGIBID quotations by Bank of Latvia

Reference rates
Economy of Latvia